The Badnerlied ("Song of the People of Baden") is the unofficial hymn of the former state of Baden, now part of Baden-Württemberg.

Origin 

The song was adapted around 1865 from a similar hymn praising Saxony, which has since fallen into obscurity.  Two reference points are the Festung in Rastatt and the industrialization of Mannheim.  The verse beginning with "Alt-Heidelberg, Du feine" originates from the poem "The Trumpeter of Säckingen", a poem written around 1852 by Joseph Victor von Scheffel, who was also a resident of Baden.
The earliest printed version of the Badnerlied appeared in 1906, in Marschlieder des 5. badischen Infanterieregiments Nr. 113 ("Marching songs of the 5th Infantry regiment of Baden").

Importance 

In the 1920s, there was talk of making the song the official hymn of Baden, but nothing came of it.  The song's popularity was rekindled in the 1950s, in the wake of Baden having been absorbed into the state Baden-Württemberg, which still remains unpopular with some inhabitants; it has since remained the most popular regional hymn in south-west Germany.

The Badnerlied is played at home games of regional football, such as SC Freiburg, Karlsruher SC or 1899 Hoffenheim, but also in other contexts.  The first four verses are the best known; the fifth (Der Bauer und der Edelmann...) is not as well known.

Variations 

The order of the verses also is subject to change, particularly swapping the second and fourth verses. Other small variations exist; in many places, steht is substituted for ist, for example In Rastatt ist die Festung becoming In Rastatt steht die Festung.

Many additional verses have been written.  Particularly popular are those dealing with specific regions or cities, as well as those disparaging Swabia.

Rothaus, the state brewery of Baden, has its own modification, replacing In Rastatt ist die Festung with In Rothaus ist die Brauerei.  This is particularly the case at association football games sponsored by the brewery.  This is not the case with SC Freiburg; Karlsruher SC displays the text on the video screen, but the audio differs.

Charts created by the radio station SWR1 placed the Badnerlied at #9 for the whole state of Baden.  Some regions scored higher; Konstanz (population 82,000) ranked it at #3; In Mosbach, it was even ranked as #1, leading an organization to name the residents of Mosbach as the 2006 Badeners of the year.

Lyrics

Sources 
 Waltraud Linder-Beroud: Ein neues Land – ein neues Lied? Badische Heimat 82 (2002), p. 96-109.
 Lutz Röhrich: „... und das ist Badens Glück“. Heimatlieder und Regionalhymnen im deutschen Südwesten. Auf der Suche nach Identität. Jahrbuch für Volksliedforschung, Jg. 35 (1990), p. 14-25.

External links 
Badnerlied with Text, Notes, and an mp3
Page with many examples of unofficial verses
The Badnerlied and other south-western German homeland hymns.

German anthems
Grand Duchy of Baden
Historical national anthems
Pages translated from German Wikipedia